Three Mile is an unincorporated community in Kanawha County, West Virginia, United States. Its post office  is closed

References 

Unincorporated communities in West Virginia
Unincorporated communities in Kanawha County, West Virginia